Ceratomyxa auratae is a species of myxozoan parasite that infects the gall bladder of the gilthead seabream, Sparus aurata. It was discovered in an aquaculture facility in southern Portugal.

References

External links 

 

Ceratomyxidae
Animals described in 2015
Fauna of Portugal
Invertebrates of Europe